Writer's block is a non-medical condition, primarily associated with writing, in which an author is either unable to produce new work or experiences a creative slowdown.

Writer's Block has various degrees of severity, from difficulty in coming up with original ideas to being unable to produce work for years. This condition is not solely measured by time passing without writing, it is measured by time passing without productivity in the task at hand. Writer's block has been an acknowledged problem throughout recorded history.

However, not until 1947 was the term Writer's Block coined by the Austrian psychiatrist Dr. Edmund Bergler. All types of writers, including full-time professionals, academics, workers of creative projects, and those trying to finish written assignments, can experience writer's block. Many writers find writer's block problematic because it has many causes; some that are even unrelated to writing. The majority of writer’s block researchers agree that most causes of writer’s block have an affective/physiological, motivational, and cognitive component.

Studies have found effective coping strategies to deal with writer's block. These strategies range from ideas such as free-writing and brainstorming to talking to a professional to remove the anxiety from writing.

History
Throughout history, writer's block has been a documented problem. Professionals who have struggled with the affliction include authors such as F. Scott Fitzgerald and Joseph Mitchell, comic strip cartoonist Charles M. Schulz, composer Sergei Rachmaninoff, and songwriter Adele. Early Romantic writers did not understand much about the topic; they assumed writer's block was due to a power that did not want them to write anymore. It became slightly more recognised during the time of French Symbolists who had famously recognised poets that gave up writing early into their career because they were unable to find the language to convey their message. During the Great American Novel period, it was widely recognised as something that would block a writer and cause them emotional instability. Research concerning this topic was done in the late 1970s and 1980s. During this time, researchers were influenced by the Process and Post-Process movements and therefore focused specifically on the writer's processes. The condition was first described in 1947 by Austrian psychoanalyst Edmund Bergler, who described it as being caused by oral masochism, mothers that bottle fed, and an unstable private love life. The growing reputation of psychiatry in the United States made the term gain more recognition. However, some great writers may have already suffered from writer's block years before Bergler described it, such as Herman Melville, who quit writing novels a few years after writing Moby-Dick.

Causes
Writer's block may have several causes. Some are creative problems that originate within an author's work itself. A writer may run out of inspiration, or be distracted by other events. A fictional example can be found in George Orwell's novel Keep the Aspidistra Flying, in which the protagonist Gordon Comstock struggles in vain to complete an epic poem describing a day in London: "It was too big for him, that was the truth. It had never really progressed, it had simply fallen apart into a series of fragments."

Other blocks may be produced by adverse circumstances in a writer's life or career: physical illness, depression, the end of a relationship, financial pressures, or a sense of failure. The pressure to produce work may in itself contribute to writer's block, especially if they are compelled to work in ways that are against their natural inclination (e.g. with a deadline or an unsuitable style or genre). The writer Elizabeth Gilbert, reflecting on her post-bestseller prospects, proposed that such a pressure might be released by interpreting creative writers as "having" genius rather than "being" a genius.

It has been suggested that writer's block is more than just a mentality. Under stress, a human brain will  "shift control from the cerebral cortex to the limbic system". The limbic system is associated with the instinctual processes, such as "fight or flight" response; and behaviour that is based on "deeply engrained training". The limited input from the cerebral cortex hinders a person's creative processes, which is replaced by the behaviours associated with the limbic system. The person is often unaware of the change, which may lead them to believe they are creatively "blocked". In her 2004 book The Midnight Disease: The Drive to Write, Writer's Block, and the Creative Brain, the writer and neurologist Alice W. Flaherty has argued that literary creativity is a function of specific areas of the brain, and that block may be the result of brain activity being disrupted in those areas. Dr. Flaherty suggested in her writing that there are many diseases that may impact one's ability to write. One of which she refers to is hypergraphia, or the intensive desire to write. She points out that in this condition, the patient's temporal lobe is afflicted, usually by damage, and it may be the same changes in this area of the brain that can contribute to writer's-blocking behaviours. Not to be confused with writer's block, agraphia is a neurological disorder caused by trauma or stroke causing difficulty in communicating through writing. Agraphia cannot be treated directly, but it is possible to relearn certain writing abilities.

Physical damage can produce writer's block. If a person experiences tissue damage in the brain, i.e. a stroke, it is likely to lead to other complications apart from the lesion itself. This damage causes an extreme form of writer's block known as agraphia. With agraphia, the inability to write is due to issues with the cerebral cortex; this disables the brain's process of translating thoughts into writing. Brain injuries are an example of a physical illness that can cause a writer to be blocked. Other brain related disorders and neurological disorders such as epilepsy have been known to cause the problem of writer's block and hypergraphia, the strong urge to write. Some other causes of writer's block has been due to writer's anxiety. Writer's anxiety is defined as being worried with one's words or thought, thus experiencing writer's block.

For a composition perspective, Lawrence Oliver said in his article "Helping Students Overcome Writer's Block": "Students receive little or no advice on how to generate ideas or explore their thoughts, and they usually must proceed through the writing process without guidance or corrective feedback from the teacher, who withholds comments and criticism until grading the final product." He says, students "learn to write by writing", and often they are insecure and/or paralysed by rules.

Phyllis Koestenbaum wrote in her article "The Secret Climate the Year I Stopped Writing" about her trepidation toward writing, claiming it was tied directly to her instructor's response. She says, "I needed to write to feel, but without feeling I couldn't write." To contrast Koestenbaum's experience, Nancy Sommers expressed her belief that papers do not end when students finish writing and that neither should instructors' comments. She urges a "partnership" between writers and instructors so that responses become a conversation.

Mike Rose stated that writer's block can be caused by a writer's history in writing, rules and restrictions from the past. Writers can be hesitant of what they write based on how it will be perceived by the audience.

James Adams noted in his book Conceptual Blockbusting that various reasons blocks occur include fear of taking a risk, "chaos" in the pre-writing stage, judging versus generating ideas, an inability to incubate ideas, or a lack of motivation.

Other research identifies neurological malfunctions as a cause. Malcolm T. Cunningham showed how these malfunctions can be linked to trauma both mental and physical.

Coping strategies
Clark describes the following strategies for coping with writer's block: class and group discussion, journals, free writing and brainstorming, clustering, list making, and engaging with the text. To overcome writing blocks, Oliver suggests asking writers questions to uncover their writing process. He then recommends solutions such as systematic questioning, free-writing, and encouragement. A recent study of 2,500 writers aimed to find techniques that writers themselves use to overcome writer's block. The research discovered a range of solutions from altering the time of day to write and setting deadlines to lowering expectations and using mindfulness meditation. Research has also shown that it is highly effective if one breaks their work into pieces rather than doing all of their writing in one sitting, in order to produce good quality work. It is also important to evaluate the environment in which the writing is being produced to determine if it is the best condition to work in. One must look into these different factors to determine if it is a good or bad environment to work in. Psychologists who have studied writer's block have concluded that it is a treatable condition once the writer finds a way to remove anxiety and build confidence in themselves.

Garbriele Lusser Rico's concern with the mind links to brain lateralisation, also explored by Rose and Linda Flowers and John R. Hayes among others. Rico's book, Writing the Natural Way looks into invention strategies, such as clustering, which has been noted to be an invention strategy used to help writers overcome their blocks, and further emphasises the solutions presented in works by Rose, Oliver, and Clark. Similar to Rico, James Adams discusses "right-brain" involvement in writing. While Downey purposes that he is basing his approach in practical concerns, his concentration on "right-brain" techniques speaks to cognitive theory approach similar to Rico's and a more practical advice for writers to approach their writer's block.

Mind mapping is suggested as another potential solution to writer's block. The technique involves writing a stream of consciousness on a horizontal piece of paper and connecting any similar or linked thoughts. This exercise is intended to help a writer suffering from writer's block to bypass the analytical or critical functioning of their brain and access the creative functioning more directly, stimulating the flow of ideas. Other techniques similar to clustering and mind mapping are the writing of notes on cards in a card file, and nonlinear electronic writing using hypertext.

Other ways to cope come from ideas such as The Brand Emotions Scale for Writers (BESW). Using the framework of the Differential Emotions Scale, the BESW works with grouping emotions into either states or traits and then classifying them as positive, negative passive, or negative active. Researchers can assess subjects, giving writers a chance to get more work done if left in the right emotional state since data suggests that writers with positive emotions tended to express more than writers with negative passive or negative active.

See also

 Analysis paralysis
 Occupational burnout
 Process theory of composition
 Procrastination

References

External links

 

Writing